Sauk may refer to:

Sauk, Albania, a village
Sauk people, group of Native Americans of the Eastern Woodlands culture group
South African Broadcasting Corporation (Afrikaans: Suid-Afrikaanse Uitsaaikorporasie)

Persons with the surname Sauk
Jacek Sauk (born 1944), Polish politician
Matthew Sauk (born 1976), American football player
Stefan Sauk (born 1955), Swedish actor and comedian

See also
Sauk-Suiattle, group of Native Americans in western Washington state in the United States
Sauk County, Wisconsin, county in the U.S. state of Wisconsin named after the Sauk people
Sauk Lake, a small, freshwater lake located in Cook County, Illinois, United States
Sauk Trail, an Indian trail across Illinois, Indiana and Michigan in the United States
Sauk Village, Illinois, a village in Cook County, Illinois, United States
Sauk Centre (disambiguation)
Sauk River (disambiguation)
Sauk, Malaysia, village
HMS Sauk, ship of the Royal Navy (formerly the USS Somers)